Moon Ska World, formerly known as Moon Ska Europe, is a ska record label based in the United Kingdom. It was founded in 1998 as the European sister label of the defunct American label Moon Ska Records, which was owned by Robert "Bucket" Hingley of The Toasters. Moon Ska World is a licensed affiliate run by Lol Pryor, the former Dojo Records and Link Records head. Due to illnesses in both Pryor and the other principal owner, Sonia "Red" Bailey, as well as deaths in their families, the label was put on hold until 2006, when Pryor changed its name to Moon Ska World and began running the label on his own.

Unlike its American counterpart, Moon Ska Europe released bands from genres outside of ska, but in 2006, the label shifted its focus exclusively towards ska and old reggae. In addition to releasing more than thirty albums licensed from Moon Ska Records, as well as early albums by The Mighty Mighty Bosstones and Buck-O-Nine, Moon Ska Europe released albums by Spunge (who later signed with Warner Bros. Records), Whitmore, King Prawn (re-releases of their first two albums) and Less Than Jake (their debut European release). In 2006, Moon Ska World signed UK underground ska act The Big, European reggae act The Upsessions, Hawaii ska/soul act Go Jimmy Go and former Bodysnatchers and Special Aka vocalist Rhoda Dakar. They have also released albums by The Toasters, The Riffs, 2 Tone supergroup Skaville UK, and skinhead reggae act Symarip.

The label has remained dormant since the release of an album and single by the Dub City Rockers in 2011.

Label Roster
 The Articles (USA)
 Big D and the Kids Table (USA)
 Dub City Rockers (Jamaica/UK) 
 Dumpster Pop
 Fandangle (UK)
 Farse (UK)
 Go Jimmy Go (USA)
 Graveltrap (UK)
 Less Than Jake (USA)
 Lubby Nugget (UK)
 The Mighty Mighty Bosstones (USA)
 Mixtwitch (Ireland)
 Chris Murray (USA)
 Pama International
 The Rudimentals (South Africa)
 Rhoda Dakar
 Sadie's Doll
 The Selecter (UK)
 Shootin' Goon (UK)
 Skaville UK
 Solabeat Alliance (UK)
 Sonic Boom Six (UK)
 Spunge (UK)
 The Toasters (USA)
 Uncle Brian
 The Upsessions (NL)
 Whitmore (UK)
 Zen Baseballbat (UK)

Notes

See also
 List of record labels

British independent record labels
Ska record labels
Underground punk scene in the United Kingdom